Patellar tendinitis, also known as jumper's knee, is an overuse injury of the tendon that straightens the knee. Symptoms include pain in the front of the knee. Typically the pain and tenderness is at the lower part of the kneecap, though the upper part may also be affected. Generally there is no pain when the person is at rest. Complications may include patellar tendon rupture.

Risk factors include being involved in athletics and being overweight. It is particularly common in athletes who are involved in jumping sports such as basketball and volleyball. The underlying mechanism involves small tears in the tendon connecting the kneecap with the shinbone. Diagnosis is generally based on symptoms and examination. Other conditions that can appear similar include infrapatellar bursitis, chondromalacia patella and patellofemoral syndrome.

Treatment often involves resting the knee and physical therapy. Evidence for treatments, including rest, however is poor. Recovery can take between months and persist over years. It is relatively common with about 14% of athletes currently affected; however research reflects that more than half of athletes with this injury end their careers as a result. Males are more commonly affected than females. The term "jumper's knee" was coined in 1973.

Signs and symptoms
People report anterior knee pain, often with an aching quality. The symptom onset is insidious. Rarely is a discrete injury described. Usually, the problem is below the kneecap but it may also be above. Jumper's knee can be classified into 1 of 4 stages, as follows:

Stage 1 – Pain only after activity, without functional impairment

Stage 2 – Pain during and after activity, although the person is still able to perform satisfactorily in his or her sport

Stage 3 – Prolonged pain during and after activity, with increasing difficulty in performing at a satisfactory level

Stage 4 – Complete tendon tear requiring surgical repair

It begins as inflammation in the patellar tendon where it attaches to the patella and may progress by tearing or degenerating the tendon. People present with an ache over the patella tendon. Most people are between 10 and 16 years old.  Magnetic resonance imaging can reveal edema (increased T2 signal intensity) in the proximal aspect of the patellar tendon.

Causes
It is an overuse injury from repetitive overloading of the extensor mechanism of the knee. The microtears exceed the body's healing mechanism unless the activity is stopped.

Among the risk factors for patellar tendonitis are low ankle dorsiflexion, weak gluteal muscles, and muscle tightness, particularly in the calves, quadriceps muscle, and hamstrings.

It may be associated with stiff ankle movement and ankle sprains.

Diagnosis
Diagnosis is generally based on symptoms and a physical examination. Ultrasound or magnetic resonance imaging may help clarify how severe the problem is.

Treatment
Evidence for treatment is poor.  In the early stages rest, ice, compression, and elevation may be tried.  Tentative evidence supports exercises involving eccentric muscle contractions of the quadriceps on a decline board.  Specific exercises and stretches to strengthen the muscles and tendons may be recommended, e.g. cycling or swimming.  Use of a strap for jumper's knee and suspension inlays for shoes may also reduce the problems.  Corticosteroid injections and NSAIDs are generally recommended.

Procedures
Dry needling, sclerosing injections, platelet-rich plasma, extracorporeal shock wave treatment, and heat therapy have been tried.

Surgery
Surgery may be tried if other measures fail. This may involve removal of myxoid degeneration in the tendon. This is reserved for people with severe pain for 6–12 months despite conservative measures. Novel treatment modalities targeting the abnormal blood vessel growth which occurs in the condition are currently being investigated. Knee operations in most cases have no better effects than exercise programs.

Epidemiology
It is relatively common with about 14% of athletes currently affected. Males are more commonly affected than females.

References

External links

Overuse injuries
Soft tissue disorders
Patella
Wikipedia medicine articles ready to translate